The trifluoromethoxy group  is the chemical group –O–. It can be seen as a methoxy group –O– whose hydrogen atoms are replaced by fluorine atoms; or as a trifluoromethyl group attached to the rest of the molecule by a bridging oxygen atom. Compounds having this functional group are of some relevance as pharmaceuticals. One example is riluzole.

References

Haloalkyl groups